The IGR Remscheid is a Roller Hockey team from Remscheid, North Rhine-Westphalia, Germany.

History
Founded on 1 April 1962, IGR Remscheid won 5 German championships (1968, 69, 78, 92 and 94). In the preliminary round of the Rollhockey-Bundesliga 2015-16 IGR Remscheid finished on no. 7. For the first time in club history IGR Remscheid won the German cup in 2016.

Trophies
5 German Championship
1 German Cup

References

External links
IGR Remscheid Official Website

Roller hockey clubs in Germany
Sports clubs established in 1962